What Is the Third Estate? is a political pamphlet written in January 1789, shortly before the outbreak of the French Revolution, by the French writer and clergyman Abbé Emmanuel Joseph Sieyès (1748–1836). The pamphlet was Sieyès' response to finance minister Jacques Necker's invitation for writers to state how they thought the Estates-General should be organized.

In the pamphlet, Sieyès argues that the third estate – the common people of France – constituted a complete nation within itself and had no need of the "dead weight" of the two other orders, the first and second estates of the clergy and aristocracy. Sieyès stated that the people wanted genuine representatives in the Estates-General, equal representation to the other two orders taken together, and votes taken by heads and not by orders. These ideas came to have an immense influence on the course of the French Revolution.

Summary
The pamphlet is organized around three rhetorical questions and Sieyès' responses. The questions and responses are: 
What is the Third Estate? Everything.
What has it been hitherto in the political order? Nothing.
What does it desire to be? To become something...

Throughout the pamphlet, Sieyès argues that the first and second estates are simply unnecessary, and that the Third Estate is in truth France's only legitimate estate, representing as it does the entire population. Thus, he asserts, it should replace the other two estates entirely. 
The Third Estate bears the weight of the majority of tax.

See also
Estates of the realm
Pluralism (political philosophy)
Modernism

References

External links

Excerpts from What is the Third Estate? Internet History Sourcebooks – Fordham University. Retrieved 9 January 2013.

Political history of the Ancien Régime
1789 non-fiction books
Pamphlets of the French Revolution